Guilherme Melo may refer to:

 Guilherme Melo (politician) (1952–2021), Brazilian politician
 Guilherme Melo (squash player) (born 1991), Brazilian squash player